Otto Julius Klotz OLS, DLS, DTS (March 31, 1852 – December 28, 1923) was a Canadian astronomer and Dominion Surveyor.

He was born in Preston (Cambridge), Upper Canada, the son of Otto Klotz and Elise (Elizabeth) Wilhelm, Klotz was educated at Galt Grammar School, and later headed to University of Toronto, and finished his degree in 1872 in Civil Engineering at the University of Michigan in Ann Arbor, Michigan.

At 14 years of age, Klotz received a foolscap diary in which he recorded every day of life, except for two days when he crossed the date line. The personal and professional records are entered into the National Archives of Canada.

In 1885, Klotz was the first person to be officially designated as astronomer in the Dominion of Canada. He had been assigned chief of astronomical observations to be conducted in British Columbia and the North West. He worked on the British Columbia Railway Belt Survey from 1885 to 1890, and was assigned the task to resolve the United States and Canada boundary dispute during the 1890s. Klotz also worked on the Alaska boundary survey in 1893-1894. While in London, England in 1898, he discovered an important cache of Foreign Office correspondence, much of which pertained to the North American Boundary Commission, some of whose Royal Engineer members were photographers.

Klotz was appointed one (1908 as Assistant Chief Astronomer) of two employees of the Dominion Observatory, the nation's first astronomical observatory. In 1916 he was appointed Dominion Astronomer.

His other claims to fame include the oversight of the All Red Cable Route connecting Australia and Canada in 1902, and he has been called the father of the Public Library in Ottawa University Club. He was also a member of the Astronomical Association of Mexico and of New Zealand Institute. During his work in British Columbia he was the first to determine the heights of principal mountain peaks along the railway and named many of them.

He died in Ottawa on December 28, 1923.

References

 City of Cambridge Hall of Fame
 

1852 births
1923 deaths
19th-century Canadian astronomers
Canadian people of German descent
University of Michigan College of Engineering alumni
Canadian diarists
Persons of National Historic Significance (Canada)
20th-century Canadian astronomers